Fangchuan is a village in Jingxin ( / 경신진), Hunchun, Yanbian Korean Autonomous Prefecture, Jilin, China. There is a national scenic area in Fangchuan.

See also
Lake Khasan
Battle of Lake Khasan
Khasansky District

References

Hunchun
China–North Korea border
China–Russia border
Villages in China